Alexander Georgievich Savchenko (30 March 1951 – 18 February 2022) was a Kazakh politician. A member of the Nur Otan party, he served in the Senate of Kazakhstan from 2008 to 2014. He died on 18 February 2022, at the age of 70.

Biography 

Born on March 30, 1951 in the city of Dzhambul.

In 1977 he graduated from the Jambul technological Institute of Light and Food Industry in the specialty "Mechanical Engineer".

In 1991 he graduated from the Almaty Institute of Political Science and Department in the specialty "Lecturer of socio-political disciplines in higher and secondary educational institutions".

Awards and titles 

 Order Curmet (2003)
 Order Dostyk II degree (2011)
 Medal “For the difference in the prevention and elimination of emergency situations”.
 Jubilee medal "20 years Astana" (2018)

References

1951 births
2022 deaths
20th-century Kazakhstani politicians
21st-century Kazakhstani politicians
Nur Otan politicians
Members of the Senate of Kazakhstan
Recipients of the Order of Kurmet
People from Taraz